Philippa Ruth Foot  (née Bosanquet; 3 October 1920 – 3 October 2010) was an English philosopher and one of the founders of contemporary virtue ethics, who was inspired by the ethics of Aristotle. Along with Judith Jarvis Thomson, she is credited with inventing the trolley problem. She was elected a member of the American Philosophical Society. She was a granddaughter of the U.S. President Grover Cleveland.

Personal life
Born Philippa Ruth Bosanquet in Owston Ferry, North Lincolnshire, she was the daughter of Esther Cleveland (1893–1980) and Captain William Sidney Bence Bosanquet (1893–1966) of the Coldstream Guards of the British Army. Her paternal grandfather was barrister and judge, Sir Frederick Albert Bosanquet, Common Serjeant of London from 1900 to 1917. Her maternal grandfather was the 22nd and 24th President of the United States, Grover Cleveland.

Education and career
Foot was educated privately and at Somerville College, Oxford, 1939–1942, where she attained a first-class degree in philosophy, politics, and economics. Her association with Somerville, interrupted only by government service as an economist from 1942 to 1947, continued for the rest of her life. She was a lecturer in philosophy, 1947–1950; fellow and tutor, 1950–1969; senior research fellow, 1969–1988; and honorary fellow, 1988–2010. She spent many hours there in debate with G. E. M. Anscombe, who persuaded her that non-cognitivism was misguided.

In the 1960s and 1970s, Foot held a number of visiting professorships in the United States, including at Cornell, MIT, Berkeley, and City University of New York. She was appointed Griffin Professor of Philosophy at the University of California, Los Angeles in 1976 and taught there until 1991, dividing her time between the United States and Britain.

Contrary to common belief, Foot was not a founder of Oxfam. She joined the organization about six years after its foundation. She was an atheist. She was once married to the historian M. R. D. Foot, and at one time shared a flat with the novelist Iris Murdoch. She died in 2010 on her 90th birthday.

Critique of non-cognitivism
Foot's work in the 1950s and 1960s sought to revive Aristotelian ethics in modernity, competing with its major rivals, modern deontology and consequentialism (the latter a term dubbed by Anscombe). Some of her work was crucial to a re-emergence of normative ethics within analytic philosophy, notably her critiques of consequentialism and non-cognitivism. Foot's approach was influenced by the later work of Wittgenstein, although she seldom dealt explicitly with his materials.

In her earlier career, Foot's works were meta-ethical in character, pertaining to the nature and status of moral judgment and language. Her essays "Moral Arguments" and "Moral Beliefs" were significant in dethroning non-cognitivism as the dominant meta-ethical theory of preceding decades.

Though non-cognitivism may be traced back to Hume's Is–ought problem, its most explicit formulations are found in the works of A. J. Ayer, C. L. Stevenson, and R. M. Hare, who focused on abstract or "thin" ethical concepts such as good/bad and right/wrong. They argued that moral judgments do not express propositions, i.e., that they are not truth-apt, but express emotions or imperatives. Thus, fact and value are independent of each other.

This analysis of abstract or "thin" ethical concepts was contrasted with more concrete or "thick" concepts, such as cowardice, cruelty, and gluttony. Such attributes do not swing free of the facts, yet they carry the same "practicality" that "bad" or "wrong" do. They were intended to combine the particular, non-cognitive "evaluative" element championed by the theory with the descriptive element. One could detach the evaluative force by employing them in an "inverted commas sense", as one does in attempting to articulate thoughts in a system one opposes, for example by putting "unmanly" or "unladylike" in quotation marks. That leaves purely descriptive expressions that apply to actions, whereas employing such expressions without the quotation marks would add the non-cognitive extra of "and such action is bad".

Foot objected to this distinction and its underlying account of thin concepts. Her defense of the cognitive and truth-evaluable character of moral judgment made the essays crucial in bringing the question of the rationality of morality to the fore.

Practical considerations involving "thick" ethical concepts – "but it would be cruel", "it would be cowardly", "it's for her to do", or "I promised her I wouldn't do it" – move people to act one way rather than another, but remain as purely descriptive as any other judgment pertaining to human life. They differ from thoughts such as "it would be done on a Tuesday" or "it would take about three gallons of paint" not by admixing what she considers a non-factual, attitude-expressing, "moral" element, but simply by the fact that people have reason not to do things that are cowardly or cruel. Her lifelong devotion to the question is apparent in all periods of her work.

Morality and reasons

"Why be moral?" – early work
It is on the "why be moral?" question (which for her may be said to divide into the questions "why be just?", "why be temperate?", etc.) that her doctrine underwent a surprising series of reversals. In "Moral Beliefs", she had argued that the received virtues – courage, temperance, justice, and so on – are typically good for their bearer. They make people stronger, so to speak, and condition to happiness. This holds only typically, since the courage of a soldier, for instance, might happen to be precisely his downfall, yet is in some sense essential: possession of sound arms and legs is good as well. However, damaged legs may happen to exclude someone from conscription that assigns contemporaries to their deaths. So people have reason to act in line with the canons of these virtues and avoid cowardly, gluttonous, and unjust action. Parents and guardians who want the best for children will steer them accordingly.

The "thick" ethical concepts that she emphasized in her defense of moral judgment's cognitive character were precisely those associated with such "profitable" traits, i. e., virtues; this is how such descriptions differ from randomly chosen descriptions of action. The crucial point was that the difference between "just action" and "action performed on Tuesday" (for example) was not a matter of superadded "emotive" meaning, as in Ayer and Stevenson, nor a latent imperative feature, as in Hare. It is just that justice makes its bearer strong, which gives us a reason to cultivate it in ourselves and our loved ones by keeping to the corresponding actions.

So Foot's philosophy must address Nietzsche and the Platonic immoralists: perhaps the received ostensible virtues in fact warp or damaged the bearer. She suggests that modern and contemporary philosophers (other than Nietzsche) fear to pose this range of questions because they are blinded by an emphasis on a "particular just act" or a particular courageous act, rather than the traits that issue from them. It seems that an agent might come out the loser by such act. The underlying putative virtue is the object to consider.

"Why be moral?" – middle work
Fifteen years later, in the essay "Morality as a System of Hypothetical Imperatives", she reversed this when it came to justice and benevolence, that is, the virtues that especially regard other people. Although everyone has reason to cultivate courage, temperance and prudence, whatever the person desires or values, still, the rationality of just and benevolent acts must, she thought, turn on contingent motivations.  Although many found the thesis shocking, on her (then) account, it is meant to be, in a certain respect, inspiring: in a famous reinterpretation of a remark of Kant, she says that "we are not conscripts in the army of virtue, but volunteers"; the fact that we have nothing to say in proof of the irrationality of at least some unjust people should not alarm us in our own defence and cultivation of justice and benevolence: "it did not strike the citizens of Leningrad that their devotion to the city and its people during the terrible years of the siege was contingent".

"Why be moral?" – later work
Foot's book Natural Goodness attempts a different line. The question that we have most reason to do ties into the good working of practical reason. This in turn is tied to the idea of the species of an animal providing a measure of good and bad in the operations of its parts and faculties. Just as one has to know what kind of animal is meant, for instance to decide whether its eyesight is good or bad, the question of whether a subject's practical reason is well developed depends on the kind of animal it is. This idea is developed in the light of a concept of animal kinds or species as implicitly containing "evaluative" content, which may be criticized on contemporary biological grounds. However, it is arguable even on that basis that it is deeply entrenched in human cognition. In this case, what makes for a well-constituted practical reason depends on us being human beings marked by certain possibilities of emotion and desire, a certain anatomy, neurological organization, and so forth.

Once this step is taken, it becomes possible to argue in a new way for the rationality of moral considerations. Humans begin with the conviction that justice is a genuine virtue. So a conviction that well-constituted human practical reason operates with considerations of justice means that taking account of other people in that sort of way is "how human beings live together." (The thought that this is how they live must be understood in a sense compatible with the fact that actual individuals often do not – just as dentists understand the thought that "human beings have n teeth" in a way that is compatible with many people having fewer.) There is nothing incoherent in the thought that practical reasoning that takes account of others and their good might characterize some kind of rational and social animal.

Similarly, there is nothing incoherent in the idea of a form of rational life. Such considerations are alien, where they can only be imposed by damaging and disturbing the individual. There is nothing analytical about the rationality of justice and benevolence. Human conviction that justice is a virtue and that considerations of justice are genuine reasons for action assumes that the kind of rational being we are, namely human beings, is of the first type. There is no reason to think such a rational animality is impossible, and so none to suspect that considerations of justice are frauds.

Of course, it might be suggested that this is precisely not the case, that human beings are of the second kind, thus that the justice and benevolence we esteem are artificial and false. Foot would hold that machismo and ladylikeness considerations are artificial and false; they are matters of "mere convention", which tend to put one off the main things. As far as justice is concerned, that was the position of the "immoralists" Callicles and Thrasymachus in Plato's dialogues, and as far as benevolence is concerned, that was the view of Friedrich Nietzsche.

With Callicles and Nietzsche, this is apparently to be shown by claiming that justice and benevolence respectively can be inculcated only by warping the emotional apparatus of the individual. Foot's book ends by attempting to defuse the evidence Nietzsche brings against what might be called the common-sense position. She proceeds by accepting his basic premise that a way of life inculcated by damaging the individual's passions, filling one with remorse, resentment and so forth, is wrong. She employs exactly the Nietzschean form of argument against some forms of femininity, for example, or exaggerated forms of etiquette acceptance. However, she claims that justice and benevolence "suit" human beings and there is no reason to accept Callicles' or Nietzsche's critiques in this case.

Ethics, aesthetics and political philosophy
Nearly all Foot's published work relates to normative or meta-ethics. Only once did she move into aesthetics – in her 1970 British Academy Hertz Memorial Lecture, "Morality and Art", in which certain contrasts are drawn between moral and aesthetic judgements.

Likewise, she appears never to have taken a professional interest in political philosophy. Geoffrey Thomas of Birkbeck College, London, recalls approaching Foot in 1968, when he was a postgraduate at Trinity College, Oxford, to ask if she would read a draft paper on the relation of ethics to politics. "I've never found political philosophy interesting," she said, adding, "One's bound to interest oneself in the things people around one are talking about," so implying correctly political philosophy was largely out of favour with Oxford philosophers in the 1950s and 1960s. She still graciously agreed to read the paper, but Thomas never sent it.

Selected works
Virtues and Vices and Other Essays in Moral Philosophy, Berkeley: University of California Press/Oxford: Blackwell, 1978 – there are more recent editions.
Natural Goodness. Oxford: Clarendon Press, 2001
Moral Dilemmas: And Other Topics in Moral Philosophy, Oxford: Clarendon Press, 2002
Morality and Art, The British Academy, read 20 May 1970, copyright 1971.
Warren Quinn, Morality and Action, ed. Philippa Foot (Introduction, ix–xii), Cambridge: Cambridge University Press, 1993

See also
Judith Jarvis Thomson
G. E. M. Anscombe
Rosalind Hursthouse
Thought experiment
Trolley problem

References

External links

Links to biographical memoirs of fellows of the British Academy, including Philippa Foot
Iris Murdoch: Memoir of Philippa Foot
 Interview with Philippa Foot in Philosophy Now magazine, 2001.
 Interview with Foot by Alex Voorhoeve A revised and slightly expanded version of this interview appears in Alex Voorhoeve, Conversations on Ethics. Oxford University Press, 2009.
A bibliography of Foot's works through 1996
 "Philippa Foot, Renowned Philosopher, Dies at 90," by WILLIAM GRIMES, The New York Times, 9 October 2010
"Phillipa Ruth Foot" in Find a Grave.

1920 births
2010 deaths
20th-century English philosophers
21st-century English philosophers
Alumni of Somerville College, Oxford
Analytic philosophers
Aristotelian philosophers
Atheism in the United Kingdom
Atheist philosophers
British atheists
Cornell family
English atheists
English people of American descent
English women philosophers
Fellows of Somerville College, Oxford
Fellows of the British Academy
Grover Cleveland family
Moral realists
People from the Borough of North East Lincolnshire
Philosophers of love
Philosophy writers
University of California, Los Angeles faculty
Virtue ethicists
Wittgensteinian philosophers